Kate Christowitz (born 5 March 1991) is a South African competitive rower.

She competed at the 2016 Summer Olympics in Rio de Janeiro, in the women's coxless pair. She and partner Lee-Ann Persse finished in 5th place.

She went to the University of Johannesburg and rowed for the UJ rowing club while there.

References

1991 births
Living people
South African female rowers
Olympic rowers of South Africa
Rowers at the 2016 Summer Olympics